Malta Township may refer to the following townships in the United States:

 Malta Township, DeKalb County, Illinois
 Malta Township, Big Stone County, Minnesota
 Malta Township, Morgan County, Ohio